

Medals

Diving

Men's events

Women's events

Swimming

Men's events

Women's events

Paralympic swimming

Synchronised swimming

Commonwealth Games
1994
1994 Commonwealth Games events